Almoayyed Tower (also known as: Dark Tower), is commercial skyscraper located in the Seef neighborhood of Bahraini capital Manama. Almoayyed consists mostly of office and business complexes. It was the tallest tower in Bahrain until the Bahrain Financial Harbour, Bahrain WTC, and the Abraj Al Lulu were constructed. Almoayyed Tower is also known as Dark Tower because of its dark colouring.

Structure
The entire construction process was divided into two Phases. Phase-1 was the construction of the tower itself, and Phase-2 was the construction of the eight-storey car park, which can accommodate over 1000 cars. The first Phase was completed in November 2003, and the second Phase was completed in 2004. Almoayyed is built on a  footprint area, and is the first building in Bahrain to possess a private helipad, which is built on the top of the building.

Facilities
Almoayyed Tower offers retail space covering its 'Mall' which encompasses the ground and mezzanine floors and has a separate entrance on the north side of the structure. The building has booster antennas from all the major telecom providers in Bahrain, meaning that signal is not lost whilst in one of the 6 elevators. The 43rd floor offers space for antennas: given Almoayyed Tower's large size relative to all other buildings in the Al Seef District, it has been a hub for telecom providers to place their antennas on Almoayyed Tower to give better reception to the rest of Manama.

Management
Almoayyed Tower is Managed by the owners of the building, YK Almoayyed & Sons Properties Co WLL.

See also
 List of tallest structures in Bahrain

References

Buildings and structures completed in 2004
Buildings and structures in Manama
Skyscrapers in Bahrain
Towers in Bahrain
Skyscraper office buildings
Retail buildings in Bahrain